Flemish Altruism (Constituent Parts 1993–1996), often referred as Flemish Altruism, is A Minor Forest's debut studio album. Some tracks were recorded in 1995 by Steve Albini and some in 1996 by Bob Weston, and was released on the Thrill Jockey label.

Track listing

 Tracks 1, 3, 5, 7 & 9 were produced by Bob Weston. Track 2, 4, 6, 8, & 10 were produced by Steve Albini.

Personnel
All credits adapted from Discogs

A Minor Forest
Erik Hoversten - guitar, singing, yelling 
John Trevor Benson - bass, singing, talking
Andee Connors - drumming, yelling
Dominique Davison - cello on tracks 3, 5, 7, & 9

Additional personnel 
 Bob Weston - producer (tracks 1, 3, 5, 7, 9)
 Steve Albini - producer (tracks 2, 4, 6, 8, 10)

References

1996 compilation albums
A Minor Forest compilation albums
Albums produced by Steve Albini
Thrill Jockey compilation albums
1996 debut albums